Djibril Fandjé Touré (born 1 November 2002) is a Guinean professional footballer who plays as a forward for Watford U23. He was included in The Guardian's "Next Generation 2019".

Career

On 29 September 2020, it was announced Touré would join Watford on a five-and-a-half-year contract effective from 1 January 2021. He also had trials with Borussia Dortmund, Bayern Munich, Roma and Nice over a 12 month period before joining The Hornets.

Touré joined Charleroi on loan for the remainder of the season on 1 February 2021. However, due to travel restrictions, he only started training with the team during the month of April. On 1 September 2021, Touré was loaned out to Austrian Second League side SV Horn for two seasons until June 2023. His loan was shortened, and he returned to Watford on 1 September 2022.

Career statistics

Club

Notes

References

2002 births
Living people
Guinean footballers
Association football forwards
Guinea youth international footballers
2. Liga (Austria) players
Watford F.C. players
SV Horn players
Guinean expatriate footballers
Guinean expatriate sportspeople in England
Expatriate footballers in England
Guinean expatriate sportspeople in Austria
Expatriate footballers in Austria